Roger Salazar may refer to:

Roger B. Salazar, author of No Man Knows My Pastries
Roger V. Salazar, media and crisis communications consultant
Roger Salazar (golfer), winner of the South Texas Open
 Roger Salazar, coach of the Arizona Sahuaros